Liffey may refer to:

Geography 

 Liffey, Tasmania, a town in Tasmania, Australia
 River Liffey, a river in the East of Ireland (flowing through Dublin)
 Liffey River, Tasmania, a river in Tasmania, Australia

Ships 

 , a number of ships of the Royal Navy